In enzymology, a D-lyxose ketol-isomerase is an enzyme that catalyzes the chemical reaction

D-lyxose  D-xylulose

Hence, this enzyme has one substrate, D-lyxose, and one product, D-xylulose.

This enzyme belongs to the family of isomerases, specifically those intramolecular oxidoreductases interconverting aldoses and ketoses.  The systematic name of this enzyme class is D-lyxose aldose-ketose-isomerase. Other names in common use include D-lyxose isomerase, and D-lyxose ketol-isomerase.  This enzyme participates in pentose and glucuronate interconversions.

Structural studies

References

 

EC 5.3.1
Enzymes of known structure